Avoyelles is a parish located in central eastern Louisiana on the Red River where it effectively becomes the Atchafalaya River and meets the Mississippi River.  As of the 2020 census, the population was 39,693. The parish seat is Marksville. The parish was created in 1807, with the name deriving from the French name for the historic Avoyel people, one of the local Indian tribes at the time of European encounter.

Today the parish is the base of the federally recognized Tunica-Biloxi Indian Tribe, who have a reservation there. The tribe has a land-based gambling casino on their reservation. It is located in Marksville, the parish seat, which is partly within reservation land.

History
Native Americans occupied this area beginning around 300 BC. Varying indigenous cultures flourished there in the following centuries. Today on the banks of the old Mississippi River channel in Marksville, three large burial mounds have been preserved from the Mississippian culture, which flourished especially along the upper Mississippi, the Ohio River and other tributaries, from about 900 AD to 1500 AD. Mounds of its major city, Cahokia, are preserved in western Illinois across the Mississippi from St. Louis, Missouri. The trading network reached from the Gulf Coast to the Great Lakes. A museum and a National Park commemorate this early culture.

The Tunica people had bands whose territory extended into the central Mississippi Valley. They absorbed the smaller remnant of Avoyel people nearly two centuries ago. Through the years, they also intermarried with the more numerous Biloxi people. The peoples organized politically in the 20th century and were federally recognized in 1981 as the Tunica-Biloxi Indian Tribe. They are the largest Native American tribe in Avoyelles Parish and have a reservation that extends into Marksville. Descendants of other smaller tribes are also enrolled in this tribe.

Avoyelles Parish is known for its French colonial history and tradition of French language use.  The contemporary Creole traditions, in both music and food, reflect European, African and Native American influences. While Avoyelles has a distinctive history of European immigrants, dominated by the French in its early history, it is considered the most northern of the 22 "Acadiana" parishes. These have a tradition of settlement by French-speaking refugees from Acadia (now eastern Canada) in the late 18th century. They contributed strongly to the development of culture in this area, as did Africans and the indigenous Native Americans. The parish is noted for its brand of Cajun/Creole style music and its gumbo, a popular soup with roots in the three major ethnicities noted above.

The central part of Avoyelles Parish is sited on a large plateau, slightly above the floodplain of the waterways. Travel by water was long the primary way to move around this area. The Indians used canoes, and the early French settlers developed their own boats, known as pirogues.

Records from the Catholic churches in Mansura and Marksville document the founding of a trading post and a Catholic school by French colonists. The merchants wanted to conduct fur trading with the Tunica Tribe and the missionaries hoped to convert the natives to Christianity. The trading post was built near the Avoyel/Tunica settlement; it was preserved until the mid-1960s. Historic roadside markers on LA 1 identify the site of the historic Catholic mission school.

Franco-European settlers first called this area Hydropolis, meaning water city, referring to the marshes and bayous. The major mode of transportation was by Indian canoe and pirogue (a French-style dug-out canoe). Church records identify settlers with all their family members listed, as well as some property; in some cases they listed slaves by name. Church records and documentation were recorded in French during the years of  initial settlement, then in Spanish during their brief rule in the late 18th century, with a return to French after France reacquired the area under Napoleon Bonaparte in the early 19th century.

After his troops failed to regain control over Saint-Domingue (now Haiti), Napoleon withdrew from North America. He sold the large Louisiana Purchase territory in 1803 to the United States under President Thomas Jefferson. As the US expanded its rule, local documents began to be recorded in the English of the new government. The United States arranged for the Lewis and Clark Expedition and others to survey the Louisiana Territory. It hired local French soldiers, surveyors and doctors, many of whom eventually settled in the area.

Many of the French people who settled Avoyelles Parish immigrated from France in the late 18th and early 19th centuries. Many of the French words commonly used today in the parish date to terms used during the Napoleon period in France, indicating that this was the period of immigration. They have not been used in France for many generations.

The Spanish influence in Louisiana was more dominant in New Iberia — this was named after colonists from the Iberian Peninsula, commonly known as Spain and Portugal. There are no Spanish surnames in Avoyelles. A few families from French Canada (Quebec) settled in Avoyelles. They were from a different geographic area of Canada than the Acadians of present-day Nova Scotia, who were expelled by the British from their homeland (Acadie) beginning in 1755 during the Seven Years' War with France. Many deported Acadians eventually made it to Louisiana from 1764 - 1788, after several years of living in exile along the eastern Atlantic seaboard, Canada, St. Pierre and France.

In the later 19th century, immigrants from Scotland, Belgium, Italy, and Germany also settled here, following the French Creoles. Together they established today's towns and villages. Their direct ties to Europe set them apart from the Acadians (Cajuns) of southern Louisiana, who came from a culture established for generations in Canada. At the turn of the 19th century, free people of color of African-French descent also settled in Avoyelles. Many came from New Orleans, which had a large community of free people of color. Others were refugees from Saint-Domingue, where slaves had rebelled to gain independence as the nation of Haiti. Others came from other colonies in the French West Indies.

The blending of these three cultures: Native American, European and African, created a distinct Louisiana Creole culture noted in the local language, food, Catholic religion, and family ties.

In the 21st century, the Avoyelles Parish culture has been classified as "Cajun" because of the perceived similarities in speech, food, and various folk traditions with the more southern Acadian parishes. But, few families in Avoyelles are of Acadian descent. From the 1800s until the mid 1900s, local Confederate units and local newspaper reports in The Villager always referred to the Avoyelles French families as Creoles, the term for native-born people of direct descent from early French colonists and born in the colony.

In 1906, V.L. Roy served as education superintendent in both Avoyelles and Lafayette parishes. In 1908, he helped with the founding of the Corn Club, later known as the Louisiana 4-H Club.

Following the disastrous Great Flood of 1927, the US Army Corps of Engineers built a system of levees along the Mississippi River. It reduced immediate flooding in Marksville and other towns, but has caused indirect damage to the wetlands. This has ultimately caused more serious flooding as the speed of the river has increased.

Geography

The parish is bounded on the east by what was just the Red River in the first millennium CE, and is now the Red River and Atchafalaya River. The formation of the Atchafalaya River happened when the Mississippi River changed course, breaking up the Red River. In the 20th century the Old River Control Structure was built at this area to control the flow of the three rivers.

Major highways
  Interstate 49
  U.S. Highway 71
  Louisiana Highway 1
  Louisiana Highway 29
  Louisiana Highway 107

Adjacent parishes

 La Salle Parish (north)
 Catahoula Parish (north)
 Concordia Parish  (northeast)
 West Feliciana Parish  (east)
 Pointe Coupee Parish  (southeast)
 St. Landry Parish  (south)
 Evangeline Parish  (southwest)
 Rapides Parish  (west)

National protected areas
 Grand Cote National Wildlife Refuge (part)
 Lake Ophelia National Wildlife Refuge

Demographics

2020 census

As of the 2020 United States census, there were 39,693 people, 15,163 households, and 9,840 families residing in the parish.

2010 census
As of the 2010 United States Census, there were 42,073 people living in the parish. 67.0% were White, 29.5% Black or African American, 1.2% Native American, 0.3% Asian, 0.4% of some other race and 1.6% of two or more races. 1.4% were Hispanic or Latino (of any race). 34.6% were of French, French Canadian or Cajun and 11.3% American ancestry.

2000 census
As of the census of 2000, there were 41,481 people, 14,736 households, and 10,580 families living in the parish.  The population density was 50 people per square mile (19/km2).  There were 16,576 housing units at an average density of 20 per square mile (8/km2).  The racial makeup of the parish was 68.47% White, 29.49% Black or African American, 1.01% Native American, 0.17% Asian, 0.19% from other races, and 0.66% from two or more races.  0.97% of the population were Hispanic or Latino of any race. 17.64% reported speaking French or Cajun French at home, while 2.12% speak Spanish.

There were 14,736 households, out of which 36.30% had children under the age of 18 living with them, 51.70% were married couples living together, 15.70% had a female householder with no husband present, and 28.20% were non-families. 25.00% of all households were made up of individuals, and 11.90% had someone living alone who was 65 years of age or older.  The average household size was 2.60 and the average family size was 3.11.

In the parish the population was spread out, with 26.80% under the age of 18, 9.20% from 18 to 24, 29.00% from 25 to 44, 21.30% from 45 to 64, and 13.70% who were 65 years of age or older.  The median age was 35 years. For every 100 females there were 96.40 males.  For every 100 females age 18 and over, there were 93.90 males.

The median income for a household in the parish was $23,851, and the median income for a family was $29,389. Males had a median income of $27,122 versus $18,250 for females. The per capita income for the parish was $12,146.  About 21.70% of families and 25.90% of the population were below the poverty line, including 32.50% of those under age 18 and 25.00% of those age 65 or over.

Education 
All primary public schools are run by the Avoyelles Parish School Board. It operates 10 schools with an enrollment over 6,000 students. The school board website is Avoyelles Parish School Board.

Elementary
 Cottonport Elementary
 Bunkie Elementary
 Lafargue Elementary
 Marksville Elementary
 Plaucheville Elementary
 Riverside Elementary
 Sacred Heart School, Moreauville
 St. Anthony of Padua School, Bunkie
 St. Joseph School, Plaucheville
 St. Mary of the Assumption School, Cottonport

High school
 Avoyelles High School (Moreauville)
 Avoyelles Public Charter School
 Bunkie High School
 LASAS (Louisiana School for the Agricultural Sciences)
 Marksville High School
 Red River Charter Academy
 St. Joseph's High School of Plaucheville

National Guard
The 1020th Engineer Company (Vertical) of the 527th Engineer Battalion of the 225th Engineer Brigade is located in Marksville, Louisiana.  The 1086TH Transportation Company of the 165TH CSS (Combat Service Support) Battalion of the 139TH RSG (Regional Support Group) resides in Bunkie, Louisiana.

Communities

Cities 
 Bunkie
 Marksville (parish seat and largest municipality)

Towns
 Cottonport
 Evergreen
 Mansura
 Simmesport

Villages
 Hessmer
 Moreauville
 Plaucheville

DMA 
 Alexandria LA DMA

Unincorporated areas

Census-designated places 
 Bordelonville
 Center Point
 Fifth Ward

Other unincorporated communities 

 Belle d'Eau
 Belleville
 Big Bend
 Bodoc
 Cassandra
 Effie
 Hamburg
 Moncla
 Vick
 Yellow Bayou

Notable people

Artists, authors and entertainers:
 Sue Eakin, historian, author of Avoyelles Parish: Crossroads of Louisiana
 Alcide "Blind Uncle" Gaspard, early recording artist of traditional Cajun music.
 Little Walter, Marion Walter Jacobs. musician and harmonica player, elected to the Rock and Roll Hall of Fame.
 Ruth McEnery Stuart, Marksville
 Solomon Northup, a free man from Saratoga Springs, New York, was held for nearly 12 years as a slave in Avoyelles Parish after being kidnapped and sold before the American Civil War; he was freed in 1853 by New York and Marksville officials after being traced here. Published his memoir, Twelve Years a Slave (1854), which became a best-selling book. It was adapted as a 2013 film of the same name, which won Academy Awards.

Athletes:
 Mark Duper, Moreauville Miami Dolphins wide receiver
 Johnathin E. Lewis IV, born and raised in Mansura, college basketball player who currently plays for the Kansas City College Falcons in Overland Park, Kansas

Other:
 Norma McCorvey, "Jane Roe" in the landmark Roe v. Wade (1972) decision, in which the US Supreme Court ruled that women had a right to determine whether they would have an abortion.
 Felix Eugene Moncla Jr., United States Air Force pilot who disappeared over Lake Superior in 1953.

Political leaders:
 Bill Callegari, Republican former member of the Texas House of Representatives from Harris County; engineer and businessman in Katy, Texas, born in Cottonport in 1941
 F.O. "Potch" Didier, sheriff of Avoyelles Parish, 1956–1980
 Edwin Washington Edwards, four-term governor of Louisiana.
 Elaine Schwartzenburg Edwards, first wife of Edwin Edwards and appointed as U.S. Senator, serving August–November 1972
 Harvey Fields, born in Avoyelles Parish, state senator for Union and Morehouse parishes from 1916 to 1920; member of the Louisiana Public Service Commission from 1927 to 1936; former law partner and political ally of Huey Pierce Long Jr.
 Donald E. Hines, physician in Bunkie, politician and president of the Louisiana State Senate from 2004 to 2008
 Jeannette Theriot Knoll, associate justice of the Louisiana Supreme Court, retired 2016, a resident of Marksville
 Jerold Edward "Eddie" Knoll, 32nd District Attorney of Avoyelles Parish, serving c.1977 to 2003
 Adras LaBorde, longtime managing editor and political columnist of the Alexandria Daily Town Talk
 Raymond Laborde, mayor of Marksville (1958–1970), state representative (1972–1992), commissioner of administration (1992–1996)
 Adolphe Lafargue, Marksville native, newspaper publisher, state legislator from 1892 to 1899, and judge from 1899 to 1917
 Alvan Lafargue, Marksville native, physician, and the mayor of Sulphur from 1926 to 1932
 Malcolm Lafargue, Marksville native, U.S. attorney in Shreveport in 1940s; unsuccessful Senate candidate in 1950 against Russell B. Long
 Tucker L. Melancon, Bunkie, Senior United States District Judge.
 Charles Addison Riddle III, District Attorney, 2003–current, former state representative, 1992–2003.

Politics

See also
 National Register of Historic Places listings in Avoyelles Parish, Louisiana

 Ray's Ferry

References

External links
 Heinrich, P. V., 2008, Woodville 30 x 60 minute geologic quadrangle. Louisiana Geological Survey, Baton Rouge, Louisiana.
 Snead, J., P. V. Heinrich, and R. P. McCulloh, 2002, Ville Platte 30 x 60 minute geologic quadrangle. Louisiana Geological Survey, Baton Rouge, Louisiana.
 Avoyelles Parish Sheriff's Office

 
Louisiana parishes
Parishes in Acadiana
Acadiana
Louisiana placenames of Native American origin
1807 establishments in the Territory of Orleans
Populated places established in 1807